Jet4you was a low-cost airline based in Casablanca, Morocco. It operated services between Moroccan cities and destinations in France, Belgium, Germany, Switzerland, Spain, Ireland (Sunway charter) and Italy. Its main base was Casablanca Mohammed V International Airport, with focus cities at Agadir, Nador, Paris and Tangier.

History

Launch 
The airline started operations on 26 February 2006. It was owned by TUI Travel (40%), Attijariwafa Bank (20%), Investima-SGMB (20%) and MM.Marrache et Benabbes Taarji (20%). The shareholders jointly established a Moroccan company, Societe d'Investissement Aerienne, the investment vehicle behind the airline.

Jet4You was directed by Jawad Ziyat. The objective was to widen the network to other European countries and reach 1.5 million passengers by 2010, with a fleet of ten aircraft and a 395-strong team.

Short-haul flight ban 

In 2006, Walloon Minister of Transport André Antoine prohibited Jet4you from making a stopover in Liège, Belgium during a Charleroi–Casablanca flight, arguing that short-haul flights of fewer than 100 kilometres caused too much environmental damage. In December 2006, the European Commission confirmed that the ban did not violate any aviation agreements with Morocco, with Commissioner Jacques Barrot stating: 'The national authorities are allowed to take such measures, especially for environmental reasons.' Jet4you sued the Walloon Government, but in November 2008 the Court of First Instance in Namur confirmed the legality of the short-haul ban, rejecting Jet4you's damages claim and ordering the airline to pay 15,000 euros for court proceedings. Minister Antoine marked this as a victory and again urged the Federal Government of Belgium to introduce a countrywide prohibition on short-haul flights (which had been considered by the previous Federal Transport Minister, Renaat Landuyt).

Takeover by TUI 
On 17 June 2008, it was announced that TUI Travel had taken 100% ownership of the airline, and on 18 July 2009, TUI Travel signed a letter of intent to sell a majority stake in Jet4you to Royal Air Maroc.

Jet4you adopted the IATA code 8J from the now defunct Russian airline Komiinteravia. (This code was subsequently removed from Jet4you and assigned to Línea Aérea EcoJet S.A.)

On 10 January 2012, it was announced that Jet4you would be completely integrated into the Belgian company Jetairfly (now called TUI fly Belgium). Jetairfly took over all aircraft, personnel and routes from Jet4you. The integration into Jetairfly was finalised in 2012, and all operations transferred in April 2012. All aircraft are now in Jetairfly colours, and all flights are booked through Jetairfly.

Destinations

Fleet
Jet4You ceased operations in 2011, and merged with Jetairfly. For some other fleet information, see JetairFly's fleet.

References

External links

 

Companies based in Casablanca
2006 establishments in Morocco
2012 disestablishments in Morocco
Defunct airlines of Morocco
Airlines established in 2006
Airlines disestablished in 2012
Defunct low-cost airlines
TUI Group